Thomas Gundelund Nielsen (born 6 November 2001) is a Danish professional footballer who plays as a right-back for Danish Superliga club Vejle Boldklub.

Club career
He made his Danish Superliga debut for Vejle on 14 September 2020 in a game against AGF.

References

External links
 

2001 births
People from Skive Municipality
Living people
Danish men's footballers
Denmark youth international footballers
Association football defenders
Vejle Boldklub players
Danish 1st Division players
Danish Superliga players
Sportspeople from the Central Denmark Region